Events in the year 1980 in Greece.

Incumbents
President – Konstantinos Tsatsos (until 10 May), Konstantinos Karamanlis (starting 10 May)
Prime Minister of Greece – Konstantinos Karamanlis (until 8 May), Georgios Rallis (starting 8 May)

Events

Births
28 February – Kyriaki Papanikolaou, artistic gymnast
2 March – Evangelia Sotiriou, rhythmic gymnast
23 April – Georgia-Anastasia Tembou, artistic gymnast
8 September – Kyriaki Firinidou, artistic gymnast
29 October – Vasiliki Tsavdaridou, artistic gymnast
27 November – Konstantina Margariti, artistic gymnast

Deaths

References

 
Years of the 20th century in Greece
Greece
1980s in Greece
Greece